Michael Orlando may refer to:

 Michael Orlando, band member of Vampires Everywhere!
 Michael Orlando, acting director of the U.S. National Counterintelligence and Security Center